IPMP may refer to:

 IP network multipathing, a facility provided by Solaris to provide fault-tolerance and load spreading for network interface cards
 Thymol, a chemical compound also known as 2-isopropyl-5-methylphenol
 Isopropyl methoxy pyrazine, an aroma compound produced by the Asian lady beetle
 Multipath I/O, the redundant IO technology
 MPEG-4, the Intellectual Property Management and Protection
 IVS Project Management Package, a Project Management Information System